Iron Maiden are a British heavy metal band, founded in 1975 by bassist Steve Harris in London, England. After several personnel changes in the 1970s, the band settled on a lineup of Harris, Paul Di'Anno (lead vocals), Dave Murray (lead and rhythm guitars), Dennis Stratton (backing vocals, lead and rhythm guitar) and Clive Burr (drums), before they set out on their first professional tour, the Metal for Muthas Tour which supported the compilation album of the same name. After taking on a supporting slot with Judas Priest on their British Steel Tour and setting out on their own headline tour in support of their debut album, Iron Maiden, the band supported Kiss on the European leg of their Unmasked Tour, following which Stratton was dismissed because of musical differences. Guitarist Adrian Smith was hired, following which Iron Maiden set out on a short series of UK dates before recording their second studio album, Killers.

Following the resulting supporting tour, during which the band played their first shows in North America supporting Judas Priest and UFO, Paul Di'Anno was sacked for his unreliability and was replaced with former Samson vocalist Bruce Dickinson. 1982's The Beast on the Road tour, in support of their UK No. 1 album The Number of the Beast, saw the band return to the US, supporting Scorpions, Rainbow, 38 Special and Judas Priest, following which the band departed ways with drummer Clive Burr, also due to reliability issues. With Burr's replacement, Nicko McBrain, the band set out on their first complete headlining tour, 1983's World Piece Tour, after which the same lineup remained intact for three further successful tours with much larger stage productions; 1984-85's World Slavery Tour, which marked the first time a band had taken a full stage production into the Eastern Bloc, 1986-87's Somewhere on Tour and 1988's Seventh Tour of a Seventh Tour, during which the group headlined before the largest ever crowd at Donington Park.

Unsatisfied with the band's musical direction for 1990's No Prayer for the Dying, guitarist Adrian Smith left the group and was replaced with Janick Gers. For their next two tours, 1990-91's No Prayer on the Road and 1992's Fear of the Dark Tour, Iron Maiden decided to use a less elaborate stage production following their large-scale 1980's tours, after which singer Bruce Dickinson announced he would be leaving the group to focus on his solo career following a farewell tour. In 1995, the band announced Dickinson's replacement, Blaze Bayley, who would remain in Iron Maiden for two stints on the road, The X Factour and Virtual XI World Tour, during which the band played significantly smaller venues before Bayley's departure from the group was prompted by vocal issues on both tours. In 1999, Bruce Dickinson and Adrian Smith returned to Iron Maiden, completing their current six-piece lineup which has set out on nine further tours. Since then, the band's popularity has grown further than their commercial peak in the 1980s, headlining major stadiums worldwide, while the band's 2008-09 Somewhere Back in Time World Tour was described as "groundbreaking" for its introduction of the band's customised Boeing 757, Ed Force One.

Iron Maiden's long touring history has seen them perform across the globe, visiting Europe, North and South America, Oceania, Asia and Africa, from which they have released eleven live albums. The band have headlined several major festivals, such as Rock in Rio, Monsters of Rock, Download Festival, Reading and Leeds Festivals, Wacken Open Air and several editions of Sonisphere Festival. In addition, they have performed in some of the world's largest stadiums, including London's Twickenham Stadium, Gothenburg's Ullevi Stadium, Stockholm's Friends Arena, Mexico City's Foro Sol, San Juan's Estadio Ricardo Saprissa Aymá, Malmö Stadion, Helsinki Olympic Stadium, Lima's Estadio Universidad San Marcos, São Paulo's Estádio do Morumbi, Paris' Parc des Princes, Santiago's Estadio Nacional and Buenos Aires' José Amalfitani Stadium and River Plate Stadium. Overall, the band have visited 59 countries and played over 2000 concerts.

1980s tours

1990s tours

2000s tours

2010s tours

2020s tours

Notes

References
General

 
 

Specific

External links

Iron Maiden tour dates

 
I